Pernell Schultz (born 7 April 1994) is a Guyanese footballer who plays for Fruta Conquerors. He formally played for Trinidadian side Caledonia AIA where he netted 19 league goals during his short stay there.

International career

International goals
Scores and results list Guyana's goal tally first.

Honours 
Caledonia AIA
Runner-up
 TT Pro League: 2012–13

References

External links 
 

1994 births
Living people
Sportspeople from Georgetown, Guyana
Guyanese footballers
Guyanese expatriate footballers
Guyana international footballers
Guyana youth international footballers
Expatriate footballers in Trinidad and Tobago
Guyanese expatriate sportspeople in Trinidad and Tobago
Association football midfielders
TT Pro League players
Morvant Caledonia United players
Fruta Conquerors FC players
Afro-Guyanese people
2019 CONCACAF Gold Cup players
Guyana under-20 international footballers